Emma Karoliina Kari (born 15 May 1983 in Espoo) is a Finnish politician representing the Green League. She was elected to the Parliament of Finland in the 2015 parliamentary election with a vote total of 4,647. Kari has been in the City Council of Helsinki since 2008.

Kari and Kukka Ranta have written a book Kalavale, which addresses the consequences of commercial fishing.

References

1983 births
Living people
People from Espoo
Green League politicians
Members of the Parliament of Finland (2015–19)
Members of the Parliament of Finland (2019–23)
21st-century Finnish women politicians
Women members of the Parliament of Finland
Minister of the Environment of Finland
Finnish city councillors
Women local politicians